NetApp, Inc. is an American hybrid cloud data services and data management company headquartered in San Jose, California. It has ranked in the Fortune 500 from 2012 to 2021. Founded in 1992 with an IPO in 1995, NetApp offers cloud data services for management of applications and data both online and physically.

History

NetApp was founded in 1992 by David Hitz, James Lau, and Michael Malcolm as Network Appliance, Inc. At the time, its major competitor was Auspex Systems. In 1994, NetApp received venture capital funding from Sequoia Capital. It had its initial public offering in 1995. NetApp thrived in the internet bubble years of the mid 1990s to 2001, during which the company grew to $1 billion in annual revenue. After the bubble burst, NetApp's revenues quickly declined to $800 million in its fiscal year 2002. Since then, the company's revenue has steadily climbed.

In 2006, NetApp sold the NetCache product line to Blue Coat Systems.

In 2008, Network Appliance officially changed its legal name to NetApp, Inc., reflecting the nickname by which it was already well-known.

On June 1, 2015, Tom Georgens stepped down as CEO and was replaced by George Kurian.

In May 2018 NetApp announced its first End to End NVMe array called All Flash FAS A800 with release of ONTAP 9.4 software. NetApp claims over 1.3 million IOPS at 500 microseconds per high-availability pair.

In January 2019 Dave Hitz announced retirement from NetApp.

Acquisitions
 1997  Internet Middleware (IMC) acquired for $10.5 million. IMC's web proxy caching software became the NetCache product line (which was resold in 2006).
 2004  Spinnaker Networks acquired for $300 million. Technologies from Spinnaker integrated into Data ONTAP GX and first released in 2006, later Data ONTAP GX become Clustered Data ONTAP
 2005  Alacritus acquired for $11 million. The tape virtualization technology Alacritus brought to NetApp was integrated into the NetApp NearStore Virtual Tape Library (VTL) product line, introduced in 2006. 
 2005  Decru: Storage security systems and key management.
 2006  Topio acquired for $160 million. Software that helped replicate, recover, and protect data over any distance regardless of the underlying server or storage infrastructure. This technology became known as ReplicatorX (Open System SnapVault), and has since been abandoned.
 2008  Onaro acquired for $120 million. Storage service management software which helps customers manage storage more efficiently with guaranteed service levels for availability and performance. Onaro's SANscreen technology launched as such and probably later influencing NetApp OnCommand Insight.
 2010  Bycast acquired for $50 million. Technologies from Bycast gave birth to the StorageGRID object storage product.
 2011  Akorri acquired for $60 million, allowing for cross-domain analysis and advanced analytics across data center infrastructures.
 2011  Engenio (LSI) acquired for $480 million. Engenio was the external storage systems business unit of the LSI Corporation. Launched as NetApp E-Series product line
 2012  Cache IQ: Development of NAS cache systems
 2013  IonGrid: A technology developer that allows iOS devices to access users and internal business applications through a secure connection
 2014  SteelStore: NetApp acquired Riverbed Technology's SteelStore line of data backup and protection products, which it later renamed as AltaVault and then to Cloud Backup
 2015  SolidFire: In December 2015 (closing in January 2016), NetApp acquired founded in 2009 flash storage vendor SolidFire for $870 million. 
 2017   Plexistor: NetApp first announced the acquisition of a company and technology called Plexistor in May 2017. Technologies from Plexistor gave start for MAX Data product
 2017  Greenqloud was acquired with its Qstack product. Greenqloud was a private startup company that created cloud services, orchestration and management platform for hybrid cloud and multi-cloud environments.
 2017  Immersive Partner Solutions, a Littleton, Coloradobased developer of software to validate multiple converged infrastructures through their lifecycles
 2018  StackPointCloud: NetApp acquired StackPointCloud, a project for multi-cloud Kubernetes as-a-service and a contributor to the Kubernetes which started the Kubernetes Service product
 2019  Cognigo: Israeli AI-driven data compliance and security supplier
 2020  Talon: Cloud Data Storage company enabling data consolidation and security for enterprises.
 2020  CloudJumper: Cloud software in VDI and remote desktop services
 2020  Spot: handled compute management and cost optimization in the public clouds
 2021  CloudHawk.io: AWS Cloud Security Posture. 
 2021  CloudCheckr: Cloud Optimization Platform.
 2022  Fylamynt: CloudOps automation technology company.
 2022  Instaclustr: open source database startup.

Competition

NetApp competes in the computer data storage hardware industry. In 2009, NetApp ranked second in market capitalization in its industry behind EMC Corporation, now Dell EMC, and ahead of Seagate Technology, Western Digital, Brocade, Imation, and Quantum. In total revenue of 2009, NetApp ranked behind EMC, Seagate, Western Digital, and ahead of Imation, Brocade, Xyratex, and Hutchinson Technology. According to a 2014 IDC report, NetApp ranked second in the network storage industry "Big 5's list", behind EMC (Dell), and ahead of IBM, HP and Hitachi. According to Gartner's 2018 Magic Quadrant for Solid-State Arrays, NetApp was named a leader, behind Pure Storage Systems. In 2019, Gartner named NetApp as No. 1 in Primary Storage.

Products

NetApp's OnCommand management software controls and automates data-storage. ActiveIQ comes to NetApp with the acquisition of SolidFire. ActiveIQ is SaaS portal with built-in monitoring, prediction, recommendations for optimizing configurations and performance for NetApp storage systems based on machine-learning capabilities and artificial intelligence. Later ONTAP Analytics and Telemetry Service (OATS) product, which can be installed in AWS cloud and on-premise, was renamed to Active IQ Performance Analytics Services (ActiveIQ PAS).

NetApp ONTAP-based Hardware Appliances

NetApp's FAS (Fabric-Attached Storage), AFF (All-Flash FAS), and ASA (All SAN Array) storage systems are the company's flagship products. Such products are made up of storage controllers, and one or more enclosures of hard disks, known as shelves. In entry-level systems, the drives may be physically located in the same chassis as storage controllers.

In the early 1990s, NetApp's storage systems initially offered NFS and SMB protocols based on standard local area networks (LANs), whereas block storage consolidation required storage area networks (SANs) implemented with the Fibre Channel (FC) protocol.

In 2002, in an attempt to increase market share, NetApp added block-storage access as well, supporting the Fibre Channel and iSCSI protocols.  NetApp systems support Fibre Channel, iSCSI, Fibre Channel over Ethernet (FCoE) and the FC-NVMe protocol.

ONTAP

Many of NetApp's products use the company's proprietary ONTAP data management operating system,  under continuous development since 1992 which includes code from Berkeley Net/2 BSD Unix, Spinnaker Networks technology and other operating systems. There are three ONTAP platforms: FAS/AFF systems, software on commodity servers (ONTAP Select) as virtual machine or in the cloud (Cloud Volumes ONTAP). All ONTAP systems are using WAFL file systems which provide basis for snapshots and other snapshot-based and data protection technologies. Key IP from ONTAP is also used in NetApp Astra, a newer  data management-as-a-service system built for Kubernetes.

Cloud Backup
Previously known as Riverbed SteelStor before its acquisition by NetApp, this product was later renamed to AltaVault and then to Cloud Backup. Cloud Backup was initially available in three forms: as a hardware appliance, virtual appliance, and cloud appliance. Later NetApp announced the end of sale for hardware and virtual appliances. Data placed on NAS share on Cloud Backup deduplicated, compressed, encrypted and transferred with Object Protocols to object storage systems like Amazon S3, Azure Blob Storage or StorageGRID; thus Cloud Backup appears as a transparent gateway for archiving data to a private or public cloud.

NetApp HCI

NetApp Hyper-converged infrastructure (HCI) or sometimes referred by NetApp as Hybrid Cloud Infrastructure, NetApp HCI is based on commodity blade and rack servers, NetApp Element software and VMware vSphere. NetApp HCI includes a web-based GUI with installation wizard called NetApp Deployment Engine (NDE) for configuring vCenter, IP addresses, login and password, and storage nodes. NetApp HCI is different from conventional HCI designs because it has dedicated storage nodes, while other HCI systems like Dell EMC VxRail or vSAN do not have dedicated storage nodes and utilize disk drives installed in each server. Dedicated storage nodes allow the cluster to grow or decrease storage capacity and performance separately from compute nodes. Minimum NetApp HCI configuration requires two compute blade server nodes and additionally, Element software requires a minimum of 4 storage nodes but is available to customers as four physical storage nodes or two physical storage nodes and two nodes as a virtual machine playing witness role on compute nodes.

2U HCI Chassis with four half-width blade servers

Each storage node drive set consists of six SSD drives directly connected to a dedicated storage node and installed in front of the blade chassis. Each storage and compute blade nodes have 25 Gigabit Ethernet ports which could be used as 10 Gbit/s ports as well as dedicated 1 Gb ports for management purposes. Network switches were not included, and in NetApp HCI with Element software release 11 NetApp announced H-Series Switch as part of HCI, so all hardware components must be bought from NetApp. ONTAP Select available as SDS on NetApp HCI for customers interested in NAS protocols. The self-service portal allows automating common provisioning and management tasks without involving the IT team. NetApp Kuberneties Service will support NetApp HCI with the acquisition of Stackpoint. NetApp SolidFire storage and NetApp HCI can be expanded and mixed in a single cluster. At the NetApp Insight 2018 conference in Las Vegas NetApp presented two new compute nodes: H410C and H610C, where H610C includes additional GPU cards which can be used in VDI environments. Starting with Element OS version 11, automatically detected and enabled by default with the upgrade, HCI has Protection Domains functionality to provide resiliency into HCI chassis. In the case of maintenance or chassis failure, helix algorithm spans data blocks workload will automatically fail-over to another operational chassis.

SolidFire

SolidFire storage system uses OS called NetApp Element Software (formally SolidFire Element OS) based on Linux and designed for SSDs and scale-out architecture with the ability to expand up to 100 nodes and provide access to data through SAN protocols iSCSI natively and Fiber Channel with two gateway nodes. Element OS provides a REST-based API for storage automation, configuration, management, and consumption. SF node H610S has 12 2.5" NVMe SSD drives and can install only Element version 10.4, while previous models have 10 SSD drives. Element SW version 11, will not support FC. SolidFire uses iSCSI login redirection to distribute reads and writes across the cluster using helix algorithm. This architecture does not have disk shelves like traditional storage systems and expands with adding nodes to the cluster. Each node has pre-installed SSD drives. Each node can have only one type of SSD drives with the same capacity. Each SolidFire cluster can have a mix of different node models and generations. Element X uses the replication factor of 2, where blocks of data spread across the cluster which has no performance impact but require more space in contrary to Erasure Coding technology. Such architecture allows users to expand performance and capacity separately as needed. Also, SolidFire has the ability to set three types of QoS for its LUNs: minimum, maximum and burst. Burst is used as credits which were not used by the LUN while it was not received its maximums. Element X available as software-only on commodity servers. SolidFire systems using S3 protocol could backup data to an Object storage systems like StorageGRID. SolidFire could replicate data with SnapMirror protocol to ONTAP systems and starting with Element OS 11 to Cloud Volumes ONTAP. VEEAM backup and Replication 9.5 Update 4 will implement seamless integration with NetApp HCI and Solidfire provide application consistent storage snapshot capabilities, Instant VM Recovery, and Single Item Restore for some applications. CommVault Simpana also provides application-consistent storage snapshot capability for NetApp HCI and Solidfire. All HCI configurations require at least 4 10/25 Gbit/s ports for connections until Element OS 11, where two ports are enough.

StorageGRID

StorageGRID is a software-defined storage system which provides access to data via object IP-based protocols like S3 and OpenStack Swift. It is available in the form of hardware or as software. A node in a StorageGRID cluster is an appliance, virtual machine or docker container. StorageGRID is a geo-dispersed namespace clustered storage system, also known as "the grid", with an ability to make and store multiple copies (replicas) of objects (also known as Replication Factor) or in Erasure Coding (EC) manner among cluster storage nodes with object granularity based on configured policies for data availability and durability purposes. StorageGRID stores metadata separately from the objects and allows users to configure Information Lifecycle Management (ILM) policies on a per-object level to automatically satisfy and confirm changes in the cluster once changes introduced to the cluster like the cost of network usage, storage media usage changes a node was added or removed, etc. ONTAP, Cloud Backup, SANtricity, and Element X can replicate data to StorageGRID systems. SG6060 is optimized for high transactional throughput, MA, AI, and FabricPool.

StorageGRID on NetApp HCI 
Solution Deployment of StorageGRID on NetApp HCI can be deployed in three forms: Fully contained; High performance and scale; NetApp HCI and StorageGRID appliance.

E-Series

Previously known as LSI Engenio RDAC after NetApp acquisition the product renamed to NetApp E-Series. It is a general-purpose enterprise storage system with two controllers for SAN protocols such as Fibre Channel, iSCSI, SAS and InfiniBand (includes SRP, iSER, and NVMe over Fabrics protocol). NetApp E-Series platform uses proprietary OS SANtricity and proprietary RAID called Dynamic Disk Pool (DDP) alongside traditional RAIDs like RAID 10, RAID 6, RAID 5, etc. In DDP pool each D-Stripe works similar to traditional RAID-4 and RAID-6 but on block level instead of entire disk level, therefore, have no dedicated parity drives. DDP compare to traditional RAID groups restores data from lost disk drive to multiple drives which provide a few times faster reconstruction time while traditional RAIDs restores lost disk drive to a dedicated parity drive. Starting with SANtricity 11.50 E-Series systems EF570 and E5700 support NVMe over Ethernet (RoCEv2) with 100Gbit/s Ethernet ports and NVMe over InfiniBand. Starting with EF600 systems are end-to-end NVMe and capable of NVMe/FC in addition to NVMe/RoCE and NVMe/InfiniBand. Sync and async mirroring are supported with SANtricity 11.50. SANtricity Unified Manager is a web-based manager that supports up to 500 EF/E-Series arrays and supports LDAP, RBAC, CA and SSL for authorization and authentication. In August 2019 NetApp announced E600 with support for NVMe/IB, NVMe/RoCE, NVMe/FC protocols, up to 44GBps of bandwidth and full-function embedded REST API.

Converged Infrastructure
FlexPod, nFlex and ONTAP AI are commercial names for Converged Infrastructure (CI). Converged Infrastructures are joint products of a few vendors and consists from 3 main hardware components: computing servers, switches (in some cases switches are not necessary) and NetApp storage systems:
 FlexPod based on Cisco Servers and Cisco Nexus switches 
 nFlex based on Fujitsu Servers with Extreme Networks switching
 ONTAP AI using NVIDIA supercomputers with Melanox or Cisco Nexus switches.
Converged Infrastructures have tested and validated design configurations from vendors available to end users and typically include popular infrastructure software like Docker Enterprise Edition (EE), Red Hat OpenStack Platform, VMware vSphere, Microsoft Servers and Hyper-V, SQL, Exchange, Oracle VM and Oracle DB, Citrix Xen, KVM, OpenStack, SAP HANA etc. and might include self-service portals PaaS or IaaS like Cisco UCS Director (UCSD) or others. FlexPod, nFlex and ONTAP AI allows an end user to modify validated design and add or remove some of the components of the Converged Infrastructure while not all of the other Converged Infrastructures from competitors allows modification.

FlexPod

The FlexPod platform is designed to power an organization’s most demanding apps, integrate advanced cloud services, and manage data easily—bringing them more business advantages. 

With the introduction of FlexPod XCS in 2022, it offers a new level of visibility, automation and hybrid cloud connectivity. Other offerings include FlexPod Express, FlexPod Datacenter, and FlexPod AI.

 In 2022, it also introduced FlexPod as a Service, which lets organizations shift to a pay-as-you-go model.

There are few FlexPod types: FlexPod Datacenter, FlexPod Select, FlexPod Express (Small, Medium, Large and UCS-managed), and FlexPod SF. 

FlexPod Datacenter usually uses Nexus switches like 5000, 7000 and 9000; Cisco UCS Blade Servers; Mid-Range or High-End NetApp FAS or AFF systems. FlexPod Select often used with BigData framework software like Hortonworks, Cloudera, or more recently, Confluent. FlexPod SF has in its architecture Nexus 9000 switches, Cisco UCS Blade servers and NetApp SolidFire storage based on Cisco UCS rack servers. Cisco UCS Director used as the orchestrator for FlexPod for a self-service portal, workflow automation and billing platform to build PaaS and IaaS. FlexPod systems supported under the cooperative center of competence. 

NetApp Converged Systems Advisor (CSA) is a software-as-a-service (SaaS) platform that consists of an on-premises agent and a cloud-based portal.

Multi-Pod is a FlexPod Datacenter solution with a FAS or AFF system leveraging MetroCluster technology for stretching storage system between two sites. NetApp and Cisco looking to incorporate NetApp MAX Data product into FlexPod solutions once persistent memory technology will be available in UCS servers.
FlexPod Datacenter has the biggest variety of designed and validated by Cisco and NetApp architectures and applications including:
 Microsoft: SQL, Exchange, SharePoint
 Hypervisors: Microsoft Hyper-V, VMware vSphere, Citrix XenServer
 Red Hat Enterprise Linux OpenStack, Citrix XenDesktop/XenApp, Docker Datacenter for Container Management
 IBM Cloud Private, Cisco Hybrid Cloud with Cisco CloudCenter, Microsoft Private Cloud, Citrix CloudPlatform, Apprenda PaaS
 SAP, Oracle Database, Oracle RAC on Oracle Linux, Oracle RAC on Oracle VM
 3D Graphics Visualization with Citrix and NVIDIA GPU. FlexPod Datacenter for AI leveraging UCS servers with NVIDIA GPU.
 Epic EHR, MEDITECH EHR
FlexPod types:
 FlexPod Express (Small, Medium, Large and UCS-managed)
 FlexPod Datacenter
 FlexPod SF
 FlexPod Select

ONTAP AI

Converged infrastructure solution based on Cisco Nexus 3000 or Mellanox Spectrum switches with 100 Gbit/s ports, NetApp AFF storage systems, Nvidia DGX supercomputer servers. DGX servers interconnected with each other over RDMA over RoCE, and developed for Deep Learning based on Docker containers with NetApp Docker Plugin Trident. DGX servers connected to the storage with Ethernet connection and consume space over NFS protocol. With SnapMirror ONTAP AI solution can deliver data between edge computing, on-premises and the cloud as part of Data Fabric vision. ONTAP AI tested and validated for use with NFS and FlexGroup technologies. Combined technical support provided to the customers to all the architecture components.

OnCommand Insight
OnCommand Insight (OCI) is data center management software, capacity management, infrastructure analytics, centralized view into historical trends to forecast performance and capacity requirements and workload placement. OCI works with all NetApp storage systems and with competitor storage systems and in public cloud. Licensed server-based software.

Memory Accelerated Data
NetApp MAX Data for short, MAX Data is a proprietary Linux file system with auto-tiering from PMEM to SSD and data protection features for businesses. NetApp officially announced MAX Data's availability at NetApp Insight 2018 in October, supported by a number of server brands. MAX Data came from the acquisition of Plexistor in May 2017.

MAX Data consists of two tiers: Tier 1 and Tier 2, where cold data destaged to Tier 2 from Tier 1 or promoted from Tier 2 to Tier 1 when accessed, by MAX Data tiering algorithm, transparently to the applications. Currently, NetApp has recommended ratio for MAX Data as 1 to 25 for Tier 1 and Tier 2 respectively. MAX Data according to NetApp will have two modes: to use MAX Data as a POSIX-compatible (the internal name is M1FS) file system or as API memory extension. Usage of MAX Data as POSIX FS does not require application modifications while API memory extension requires applications to be modified in order to utilize this functionality. MAX Data installed on Linux hosts to utilize ultra-low latency with persistent memory such as the Optane DC persistent memory (Optane DCPMM), NVDIMM or DRAM (when persistence not needed, for example for testing purposes) memory for Tier 1 and a NetApp AFF storage system for Tier 2. Optane DCPMM is the Intel brand name of products that use 3D XPoint technology and supported starting with MAX Data version 1.3. MAX FS is a Persistent Memory-based Filesystem (PM-based FS) that doesn't require application modification but also can be a Direct Access enabled File system (DAX-enabled FS) for applications with optimization for Persistent Memory using SPDK. DAX is the mechanism that enables direct access to files stored in persistent memory arrays without the need to copy the data through the page cache. MAX data have a per-server license and do not depend on CPU, Memory or storage capacity. MAX Data has two different licensing tiers: Basic and Advanced.

Cloud Business
Cloud Central is a web-based GUI interface that provides a multi-cloud interface based on Qstack for NetApp's cloud products like Cloud Volumes Service, Cloud Sync, Cloud Insights, Cloud Volumes ONTAP, SaaS Backup in multiple public cloud providers. 

Cloud Manager is a service for high-level management of ONTAP-based systems on-premise and in the cloud: CVO, CVS, ONTAP Select, FAS, and AFF. Cloud Manager allow setup SnapMirror data protection replication between systems through the GUI interface with drag-and-drop.

Cloud Volumes On-Prem
It is a storage system installed on-premises in a customer's data center and available to the customer as service. All work for updates and technical support provided by NetApp while the customer consumes space from the storage using web-based GUI or API and performs data backup and replication if needed.

Cloud Volumes ONTAP
Formally ONTAP Cloud. Cloud Volumes ONTAP (CVO) is software-defined (SDS) version of ONTAP available in some public cloud providers like AWS, Azure, Google Cloud, and IBM Cloud. Cloud Volumes ONTAP is a virtual machine which is using commodity equipment and running ONTAP software as a service.

Cloud Volumes Service
Cloud Volumes Service is a service in Amazon AWS and Google Cloud  it is public cloud provider based on NetApp All-Flash FAS systems and ONTAP software, allowing for synchronizing data between cloud and on-premises NetApp systems.

NetApp Private Storage
NetApp Private Storage (NPS) is based on Equinix partner provided colocation service in its data centers for NetApp Storage Systems with 10 Gbit/s direct connection to public cloud providers like Azure and AWS etc. NPS storage could be connected to a few cloud providers or on-premise infrastructure, thus in case of switching between clouds does not require data migration between them.

Astra
Astra is NetApp's Kubernetes cloud service for consistent application-consistent backups, Data Cloning, and data mobility across clouds and on-premises. Astra can deploy and maintain data-rich applications across Amazon Web Services, Microsoft Azure, Google Cloud and on-premises datacenters, enabling easily backup and restoring data or migrating the applications from one Kubernetes cluster to another in a multi-cloud environment.

SaaS Backup
NetApp SaaS Backup (Previously Cloud Control) is back up and recovery service for SaaS Microsoft Office 365 and Salesforce which provide extended, granular and custom retention capabilities of backup and recovery process compare to native cloud backup. NetApp planning to extend SaaS Backup and recovery service for Google Workspace (formerly G Suite and Google Apps for Work), Slack and ServiceNow.

Cloud Sync
Cloud Sync is service for synchronizing any NAS storage system with another NAS storage, an Object Storage like Amazon S3 or NetApp Storage GRID using an object protocol.

Cloud Insights
Cloud Insights is an SaaS application for monitoring infrastructure application stack for customers consuming cloud resources and also build for the dynamic nature of microservices and web-scale infrastructures. Cloud Insights uses similar to OnCommand Insight front-end API but different technology on the back-end. Cloud Insights available as a preview and will have three editions: Free, Standard and Premium.

Cloud Secure
Cloud Secure is a SaaS security tool that identifies malicious data access and compromised users, in other words, user behavior analytics.  Cloud Secure uses machine learning algorithms to identify unusual patterns, and can identify if users have been infected with ransomware, and prevent them from encrypting the files. 

Currently supported data repositories include NetApp Cloud Volumes, NetApp ONTAP, NetApp StorageGRID, OneDrive, AWS, Google Suite, HPE, DELLEMC Isilon, Dropbox, Box, @workspace and Office 365.

NDAS
NetApp Data Availability Services (NDAS) provides data protection in the cloud GUI. This cloud service is located only in AWS but can be copied to other clouds. NDAS is for backup, data protection and disaster recovery purposes from ONTAP storage. ONTAP systems starting with ONTAP 9.5 have a built-in proxy application that converting NetApp snapshots with WAFL data and metadata into the S3 format unlike FabricPool technology, which stores only data in the object storage.  NDAS is one of the Data Fabric manifestations.

Data Fabric
Often referred as to "Data Fabric Story," the variety of integrations between NetApp's products and data mobility is considered by NetApp to be its Data Fabric vision . Data Fabric defines the NetApp technology architecture for hybrid cloud and includes: 
SnapMirror replication from SolidFire to ONTAP
SnapMirror replication from ONTAP to Cloud Backup
FabricPool tiering feature for de-staging cold data from ONTAP to StorageGRID, Amazon S3 or Azure Blob
Volume Encryption with FabricPool provide secure data storage and secure over the wire transfer of enterprise data in a cloud provider; SnapMirror between FAS, AFF, ONTAP Select and Cloud Volumes ONTAP
Archiving and DR to public cloud
CloudMirror feature in StorageGRID replicates from on-premise object storage to Amazon S3 storage and triggers some actions in AWS Cloud
SolidFire backup to StorageGRID or Amazon S3
Cloud Backup archiving to variety of object storage systems (including StorageGRID) or many cloud providers
CloudSync is replication of NAS data to object format and back
replication to Cloud Volumes Service
Data backup to on-premise storage from SaaS Backup
SANtricity Cloud Connector for block-based backup, copy, and restore of E-Series volumes to an S3, NetApp Data Availability Services for data protection from ONTAP to cloud S3 storage with backup, DR and data mining capabilities, etc.

Software integrations
NetApp products could be integrated with a variety of software products, mostly for ONTAP systems.

Automation
NetApp provides a variety of automation services directly to its products with HTTP protocol or through middle-ware software.

Docker
NetApp Trident software provides a persistent volume plugin for Docker containers with both orchestrators Kubernetes and Swarm and supports ONTAP, SolidFire, E-Series, Azure NetApp Files (ANF), Cloud Volumes and NetApp Kubernetes Service in Cloud. 

Also, NetApp with Cisco sells CI architectures which incorporate the Trident plugin: FlexPod Datacenter with Docker Enterprise Edition and ONTAP AI.

CI/CD
NetApp Jenkins Framework provides integration with ONTAP storage for DevOps, accelerating development with automation operations like provisioning and data-set cloning for test and development and leverage ONTAP for version control, create and delete checkpoints etc. Jenkins also integrate with NetApp Service Level Manager software which provides RESTful API for guarantee level of storage performance. Apprenda and CloudBees integrate and accelerate DevOps through Docker persistent volume plugin and Jenkins Framework integration. Apprenda could be integrated with OpenStack running on top of FlexPod.

Backup and recovery
CommVault, Veeam and Veritas have integrations with ONTAP, SolidFire, Cloud Backup and E-Series leveraging storage capabilities like snapshots and cloning capabilities for testing backup copies and SnapMirror for Backup and Recovery (B&R), Disaster Recovery (DR) and Data Archiving for improving restore time and number of recovery points (see RPO/RTO). Cloud Backup integrates with nearly all B&R products for archiving capabilities since it is represented as ordinary NAS share for B&R software. Backup and recovery software from competitor vendors like IBM Spectrum Protect, EMC NetWorker, HP Data Protector, Dell vRanger, Acronis Backup and others also have some level of integrations with NetApp storage systems.

Enterprise applications
NetApp systems can integrate with enterprise applications for backup purposes, cloning, provisioning, and other self-service storage features. Oracle DB can be connected using Direct NFS (dNFS) client build inside database app which will provide network performance, resiliency, load balancing for NFS protocol with ONTAP systems.

Oracle DB, Microsoft SQL, IBM DB2, MySQL, Mongo DB, SAP HANA, MS Exchange, VMware vSphere, Citrix Xen, KVM integrate with NetApp systems for provisioning, cloning and additional backup and recovery build - this includes capabilities like SnapShots, SnapVault and SnapMirror with a variety of software including NetApp's SnapCenter and SnapCreator.

OpenStack
NetApp systems have integration with such open source projects as OpenStack Cinder for Block storage (SolidFire, ONTAP, E-Series, OnCommand Insight, Cloud Backup), OpenStack Manila for Shared file system (ONTAP, OnCommand Insight), Docker persistent volumes through Trident plugin (SolidFire, ONTAP, E-Series) and others.

OEM
IBM used to OEM NetApp FAS systems under its own brand known as IBM N-series and this partnership ended May 29, 2014. Dell OEM NetApp E-Series under its own name PowerVault MD. 

September 13, 2018, Lenovo and NetApp announced its technology partnership, so Lenovo OEM Netapp products under its own name: Lenovo ThinkSystem DE (using NetApp's EF and E-Series array technology), and ThinkSystem DM uses ONTAP software with Lenovo servers and supports FC-NVMe (analog for NetApp FAS and AFF systems).

Vector Data builds rugged and carrier-grade versions of NetApp FAS, AFF, E-Series and SolidFire products with -48V DC power and other customizations under their Vault product line.

Reception

Controversy

Syrian surveillance
In November 2011, during the 2011 Syrian uprising, NetApp was named as one of several companies whose products were being used in the Syrian government crackdown. The equipment was allegedly sold to the Syrians by an authorized NetApp reseller.

On April 7, 2014, NetApp was notified by the US Department of Commerce "that it had completed its review of this matter and determined that NetApp had not violated the U.S. export laws", and that the file on the matter had been closed.

Legal dispute with Sun Microsystems
In September 2007, NetApp started proceedings against Sun Microsystems, claiming that the ZFS File System developed by Sun infringed its patents. The following month, Sun announced plans to countersue based on alleged misuse by NetApp of Sun's own patented technology. Several of NetApp's patent claims were rejected on the basis of prior art after re-examination by the United States Patent and Trademark Office. On September 9, 2010, NetApp announced an agreement with Oracle Corporation (the new owner of Sun Microsystems) to dismiss the suits.

Accolades
NetApp was listed amongst Silicon Valley Top 25 Corporate Philanthropists in 2013. NetApp was Named Brand of the Year by the Think Global Awards in 2019.

See also

 Write Anywhere File Layout (WAFL), used in ONTAP storage systems
 Team NetApp
Kaleidescape

References

Further reading

External links
 

Companies based in San Jose, California
Computer companies established in 1992
American companies established in 1992
1995 initial public offerings
Computer companies of the United States
Computer storage companies
Storage Area Network companies
Technology companies based in the San Francisco Bay Area
Companies listed on the Nasdaq